The Kačupys is a river of Kėdainiai district municipality, Kaunas County, central Lithuania. It is the right tributary of the Dotnuvėlė river. It starts from the Krakės-Dotnuva forest, then goes through Siponiai and meets the Dotnuvėlė nearby Vainotiškiai village.

The name Kačupys means 'Cat River' (i. e. is could mean 'petty, inferior river').

References

Rivers of Lithuania
Kėdainiai District Municipality